State Songs is a concept album released by John Linnell (of They Might Be Giants) in 1999. It was Linnell's third solo project and first full solo album.  It consists of tracks that are named after, and are at least partially inspired by, 15 of the 50 U.S. states. The album is surrealist in nature, suggesting that there is another West Virginia inside of the state, that one can drive a house to Idaho, that Montana is a leg, Iowa is a witch, Oregon chases after people, and Arkansas has sunken and may be replaced by a ship of its exact shape and size.

"Montana" was released as the single for the album. Rather than a standard 7" or 12" vinyl record, the disc was green and die-cut into the shape of the 48 contiguous states. It was pressed by Erika Records. The single also featured the non-album track "Louisiana" as the B-side. Originally, "South Carolina" was the album's single, but the track was too long for the grooves to fit in the small area between the labels and the edges of the United States. The labels were marked with no text, instead only showing silhouettes of their respective states.

Recording
State Songs originally existed as a short EP that John Linnell released through the Hello Recording Club. The album is notable for its use of the carousel organ, featured in four tracks. Linnell has stated that the organ was used to add variety among the standard human musicians. Two different band organs are featured on the album. The paper rolls for the organ were cut by Bob Stuhmer and adjusted by Linnell.

Linnell used a Gretsch accordion in recording the album.

Reception

State Songs received positive reviews from critics. Matthew Springer, writing for Allmusic, praised the album's surrealism and eclecticism. Music critic Robert Christgau cited "The Songs of the 50 States" and "New Hampshire" as highlights from the album.

The album spent four weeks on the CMJ 200 chart, peaking at #18.

Track listing

Personnel 
John Linnell - accordion, alto saxophone, bass clarinet, DustBuster, guitar, organ, piano, programming, synthesizers, vocals

The Statesmen
Mark Donato - drums
Mark Lerner - bass guitar
Dan Miller - guitar
Bob Stuhmer - carousel organ

Additional musicians
Kate Dennis - French horn
Brian Doherty - additional drums
Mark Feldman - violin
Dan Hickey - additional drums
Jay Sherman-Godfrey - additional guitar
Danny Weinkauf - additional bass

Production
Albert Caiati - recording
Patrick Dillett - mixing
Barbara Glauber - artwork
John Linnell - producer

References

External links
 State Songs on This Might Be A Wiki

1999 albums
John Linnell albums
Concept albums
They Might Be Giants
Rounder Records albums
Zoë Records albums
Avant-pop albums